Streetheart is a Canadian rock band, originally from Regina, Saskatchewan and later based in Winnipeg, Manitoba. Their best known songs include "Here Comes the Night" (Them cover), "What Kind of Love is This", and their cover of the Rolling Stones' "Under My Thumb".

History
Keyboard player Daryl Gutheil and bassist Ken "Spider" Sinnaeve formed a band called Witness Inc. in Regina, and later relocated to Winnipeg, where singer Kenny Shields joined the band. After renaming the band Wascana the group finally became Streetheart when guitarist Paul Dean and drummer Matt Frenette joined in 1977. A year later the band released Meanwhile Back in Paris..., and then Under Heaven Over Hell in 1979, after which Frenette dropped out to join Dean in Loverboy.  John Hannah played guitars on Under Heaven Over Hell (1979), Quicksand Shoes (1980), and Drugstore Dancer (1980).  In 1980, Streetheart won the Juno Award for "Most Promising Group of the Year".

Streetheart released a popular single in 1979, a disco-hybrid cover version of "Under My Thumb" by the Rolling Stones (an early Streetheart influence). Streetheart's version achieved gold single status in Canada. The extended live version is notable for its blazing bass solo, performed by Spider Sinnaeve.

For the next four years they released a string of albums: Quicksand Shoes (1980), Drugstore Dancer (1980), Action: Best of Streetheart (1981), the self-titled Streetheart (1982), Dancing with Danger (1983), and the double live album Live After Dark (1983). Record sales earned them six gold albums and four platinum albums in Canada.  The band broke up in 1983, after which a collection of unreleased songs called Buried Treasure was issued in 1984.

Frehley's Comet recorded their own version of "Dancing with Danger" for their 1988 album, Second Sighting.  In 1991, Hardline recorded their own version of the Streetheart song "Hot Cherie" for their 1992 album, Double Eclipse. Paul Dean recorded a version of Action on his solo album Hardcore in 1989 with additional references to disputes between himself and Kenny Shields.

At the peak of their career, Streetheart toured with several rock bands. Canadian bands included Chilliwack, Rush, Toronto, Harlequin, Max Webster, Aldo Nova, April Wine, Headpins; American bands included Sammy Hagar, Styx, Kansas, Blue Öyster Cult. They also toured with AC/DC.

Streetheart received a Juno Award, two Ampex Golden Reel Awards, a Chimo Award from Music Express Magazine, and were voted the most popular Canadian act at the Peoples' Choice Awards. In 2003, Streetheart was inducted into the Western Canadian Music Hall of Fame.

In 2008, the band released a 2 CD retrospective collection titled ...Read All About It - The Hits/Anthology.  The band continues to tour and often plays shows in its native Winnipeg.

In 2017, Kenny Shields underwent emergency surgery for a serious heart ailment, which forced the band to cancel all of its touring plans for 2017. They were to play a final farewell concert on August 29, 2017, at the Winnipeg Classic RockFest in Winnipeg, MB. However, Shields died on the morning of July 21, 2017.

On October 12, 2018, Jeff Neill announced that Winnipeg native, Paul McNair, would assume the role of lead vocalist with the band.

Discography

Studio albums

Live albums

Compilation albums

Singles

Band members
 Kenny Shields - vocalist (founding member, 1977–2017; his death)
 Daryl Gutheil - keyboards (founding member, 1977–present)
 Paul Dean - guitar (founding member, 1977–1979)
 Ken "Spider" Sinnaeve - bass (founding member, 1977–1983, 2019–present)
 Matt Frenette  - drums (founding member, 1977–1979)
 John Hannah - guitar (1979–1981)
 Herb Ego - drums (1979–1983)
 Jeff Neill - guitar (1981–1984, 2003–present)
 Billy Carmassi - drums (1983) 
 Bruce Crump - drums (1983–1984)
 Lou Petrovich - guitar (1990's)
 Brent Fitz - drums (1993–1996)
 Chris Sutherland - drums (2020-present)
 Tim Sutton - drums (2005–2016)
 Blair DePape - bass (1998-2006)
 Bruce "Jake" Jacobs - bass (2007–2016)
 Dylan Hermiston - drums
 David Langguth - drums (2019)
 Paul McNair - vocalist (2018–present)

References

External links
Kenny Shields & Streetheart Biography — Biography of band founder and lead singer Kenny Shields (copy archived March 3, 2016)
Kenny Shields & Streetheart — Official website of Kenny Shields & Streetheart
CanadianBands.com entry 
Canadian Pop Encyclopedia entry
 

Canadian hard rock musical groups
Juno Award for Breakthrough Group of the Year winners
Musical groups established in 1977
Musical groups disestablished in 1983
Musical groups reestablished in 1999
Musical groups from Regina, Saskatchewan
Musical groups from Winnipeg
1977 establishments in Saskatchewan
1983 disestablishments in Canada
1999 establishments in Manitoba